Germiston, also known as kwaDukathole, is a small city in the East Rand region of Gauteng, South Africa, administratively forming part of the City of Ekurhuleni Metropolitan Municipality since the latter's establishment in 2000. It functions as the municipal seat of Ekurhuleni, hosting the municipal council and administration.

History

Germiston was established in the early days of the gold rush when two prospectors, John Jack from the farm of Germiston near Glasgow and August Simmer from Vacha in Germany, struck paydirt on the farm of Elandsfontein. In August 1887, the pair were on their way to the Eastern Transvaal when they outspanned (rested their pack animals) on the farm Elandsfontein and decided to stay and buy the land. Both men made fortunes and the town sprang up 2 km from the Simmer and Jack mine named after Jack's fathers farm. 

In 1921, the world's largest gold refinery, the Rand Refinery, was established at Germiston. Seventy percent of the western world's gold passes through this refinery. Although gold mining gradually wound down in Germiston, to the point that by the end of the 20th century it was no longer a mining centre, the Rand Refinery remains as busy as ever.

Geography

Architecture
The city has a number of historic buildings. Among these are the St Andrew's Presbyterian Church which was built in 1905, and St Boniface Church designed by Sir Herbert Baker, which was built in 1910 (this is the second church on the site, as the Anglican Parish was founded in 1897). The church also houses the historic 1910 English Romantic Norman and Beard Organ.

The Alexander Hotel was also partly designed by Baker, using his traditional stone appearance. This building has recently been completely renovated and now houses a well-known law firm. The builder of the hotel, Alexander Stuart, some of whose descendants still live in Germiston, died when the RMS Lusitania was torpedoed in the First World War on 7 May 1915. The hotel thus remains a memorial to his pioneer work in the city over a hundred years ago.

Demographics
Of this population, 49.8% described themselves as "White", 46.8% as "Black African", 1.9% as "Coloured", and 1.5% as "Indian or Asian". No language was predominant, with the breakdown of first languages being as follows:

Economy

South African Airways moved its head office from Durban to Rand Airport in Germiston on 1 July 1935. It later moved the offices first to Johannesburg, then to Kempton Park. The city is an industrial centre with steel manufacture and distribution being the largest industries. It has large railway workshops, a large glassworks, engineering companies, gas distribution firms, and many other heavy and light industries.

Sports

Victoria Lake is better known today simply as Germiston Lake, however, the famous Sailing and Rowing Club retains the name of the Victoria Lake Club. The club is home to some of the best canoeists and rowing crews in the country, including the twenty-time South African School Champions, St Benedict's College. The lake is very popular at weekends for water-skiing and regattas. The lake grounds have recently been re-landscaped and the braai areas and shelters rebuilt.

The WesBank Raceway motorsports facility was located in the city, but it was sold to industrial estate developers in November 2007. The Raceway was formerly the Gosforth Park Race Club, one of the major horse racing facilities in Gauteng. Germiston Stadium (formerly the Herman Immelman Stadium) is also located in the city. This is also the home ground for the Germiston Simmer Rugby Club and has a tartan track for athletics.

Law and government

Government

Coats of arms
 Municipal (1)
By 1931, the Germiston municipality had assumed a pseudo-heraldic coat of arms, depicting (1) buck in the veld, (2) a scene showing mineshafts, (3) a railway train in a landscape, and (4) a half-tented ox-wagon in a landscape, the quarters separated by a red cross. The motto was Salus populi suprema lex.

 Municipal (2)
A proper coat of arms was granted by the College of Arms in August 1935. It was registered with the Transvaal Provincial Administration in August 1963 and at the Bureau of Heraldry in February 1968.

The arms were: Gules, within two bendlets Or between two ox wagons Argent, three bezants (i.e. a red shield displaying three gold coins between two diagonal gold lines between two ox-wagons).

The crest was a rising falcon (representing Rand Airport); the supporters were two eland, each resting a foot on an heraldic fountain (a white and blue striped disc); the motto was Salus populi suprema lex.

Infrastructure

Transportation

Roads
Germiston is well-connected to five major freeways or motorways that service the Greater Johannesburg region. These include to the west of Germiston, the M2 motorway that connects to the southern Johannesburg CBD, the N3 Eastern Bypass and the N12 South; On the southern side, the N17 and N3 and in the north, the N12 East and the R24 service the city.

Railways
Being a mining and industrial city, Germiston is serviced by passenger rail and the CBD has several stations, the main one being Germiston Station. The industrial areas are serviced by rail spurs and stations and the Transnet has a large depot north of the CBD in Keswick Road.

Airports
Germiston is also the location of Rand Airport, at one time one of the busiest in Africa and the southern hemisphere. Today it caters largely for light aircraft and flying schools, but is also home to the South African Airways Museum. As a result of this, two of the earlier Boeing 747 Jumbo aircraft used by SAA now reside there on permanent display.

Health systems
Germiston is served by the Bertha Gxowa Hospital, a public state hospital. Other private hospitals include Life Roseacres Hospital in Primrose.

Education

The oldest high school in the city is part of the combined St Catherine's School, an independent Catholic school which was founded by the Dominican Sisters under the leadership of Mother Rose Nyland in the city centre in 1908. The school then relocated to Piercy Avenue in the suburb of Parkhill Gardens in the 1940s. Today it is considered to be one of the leading private schools in Gauteng. Germiston High School was founded in 1917 alongside Victoria Lake; from the 1940s to 1963, the girls were based in Fourth Avenue in Lambton, at what was known as Germiston Girls' High School, whilst the boys remained at the 1917 campus as Germiston Boys' High School. In 1964, due to the need to relocate the Afrikaans Delville Primary School, the girls were moved back to combine with the boys in the original historic buildings. The school celebrated its centenary in 2017. Famous past pupils include Dr Sydney Brenner, winner of the 2002 Nobel Prize.

The Germiston Boys' High School cadet band was known throughout South Africa as one of the greatest school cadet bands ever to compete and parade in South Africa. This cadet band's record of achievement is unparalleled in the history of South African school cadet bands. The band started its success from the year 1952, running up to and including 1964. Often the band would record an average mark of 99 percent overall. (Music performance, drumming, bugle and trumpet ensemble, along with drill, dress and discipline).

The school boasted a very large and active music centre for a number of years, which grew largely due to the work of the late George Burgess. The various jazz and concert bands that were the product of the music centre recorded various long playing records, won awards in various Eisteddfods and national competitions and appeared on television. Sadly, due to education department budget restructuring, the music centre was closed. The school still enjoys the singing of an excellent choir.

The rowing club, which won the South African National Championships in 1980, is still flourishing, and the oarsmen and women compete at all the school regattas.

Notable people
Notable people to come from Germiston include:
 Dr Sydney Brenner, winner of the 2002 Nobel Prize in Physiology or Medicine
 Hestrie Cloete, world champion in high jump
 Neville Colman, hematologist and DNA expert
 John Cundill, journalist and playwright
 Jeannie de Gouveia (better known as Jeannie D), TV presenter, media personality and founder of Finery Gin.
 Trevor Denman, an American sportscaster and public-address announcer specialising in thoroughbred horse racing
 Arlene Dickinson, South African-Canadian entrepreneur
 Mike dos Santos, strategist, dancer and writer
 Ernie Els, golfer who attended Delville Primary School and Jan de Klerk High School.
 Malcolm Marx, South African rugby player (2019 Rugby World Cup winner)
 Ted Grant, Trotskyist politician and theorist
 Bertha Gxowa, anti-apartheid and women's rights activist and trade unionist
 Pierre Issa, Lebanese South African former footballer
 Albert Johanneson, professional footballer and first black player to play in the FA Cup
 Bobby Locke, professional golfer, winner of four Open Championships
 André Nel, South African cricket fast bowler
 Sir Hugh Saunders, air chief marshal
 Stanley Skewes, mathematician
 Helen Suzman, anti-apartheid activist and politician
 Marie Warder, journalist who went on to champion the cause of hemochromatosis

References

External links

 
East Rand
Populated places in Ekurhuleni
Populated places established in 1886